The 2019–20 Slovenian Second League season was the 29th edition of the Slovenian Second League. The season began on 27 July 2019 and ended prematurely on 11 May 2020 due to the COVID-19 pandemic, with the last matches played on 8 March 2020.

Competition format
Each team was supposed to play a total of 30 matches (15 home and 15 away). Teams played two matches against each other (1 home and 1 away).

Teams

League table

Standings

Results

Season statistics

Top goalscorers

Source: NZS

See also
2019–20 Slovenian Football Cup
2019–20 Slovenian PrvaLiga
2019–20 Slovenian Third League

References

External links
Official website 

Slovenian Second League seasons
2
Slovenia
Slovenia